The men's 100 metre freestyle event at the 1948 Olympic Games took place between 30 and 31 July at the Empire Pool. There were 41 competitors from 19 nations. Nations had been limited to three swimmers each since the 1924 Games. The event was won by Wally Ris, returning the United States to the podium in the event after a one-Games absence broke a seven-Games streak. It was the sixth victory for an American in the 100 metre freestyle, most of any nation. Another American, Alan Ford, took silver. Géza Kádas of Hungary earned bronze, the nation's third medal in four Games. Japan's three-Games medal streak in the event ended with no Japanese swimmers competing due to the nation not being invited after World War II.

Background

This was the 10th appearance of the men's 100 metre freestyle. The event has been held at every Summer Olympics except 1900 (when the shortest freestyle was the 200 metres), though the 1904 version was measured in yards rather than metres.

None of the seven finalists from the pre-World War II 1936 Games returned. Alex Jany, a teenager from France, was the favorite in the event. The American team, including world record holder Alan Ford, was also strong. Ford had beaten Jany's record a month before the Games.

Cuba, Iceland, India, and Mexico each made their debut in the event. The United States made its 10th appearance, having competed at each edition of the event to date.

Competition format

The competition used a three-round (quarterfinals, semifinals, final) format. The advancement rule was a modification of the one used since 1912, allowing the top swimmers in each race plus one or more wild cards to advance. For this event, the top two in each preliminary heat plus the next four fastest swimmers would advance to the semifinals; the top three in each semifinal plus the next two fastest swimmers would move on to the final. There were 6 heats of between 6 and 8 swimmers, allowing 16 swimmers to advance to the semifinals. The 2 semifinals had 8 swimmers each; 8 advanced to the final.

This swimming event used freestyle swimming, which means that the method of the stroke is not regulated (unlike backstroke, breaststroke, and butterfly events). Nearly all swimmers use the front crawl or a variant of that stroke. Because an Olympic-size swimming pool is 50 metres long, this race consisted of two lengths of the pool.

Records

These were the standing world and Olympic records (in seconds) prior to the 1948 Summer Olympics.

Wally Ris equaled the Olympic record in the second semifinal with 57.5 seconds, then beat it with 57.3 seconds in the final.

Schedule

Results

Heats

Heat 1

Heat 2

Heat 3

Heat 4

Heat 5

Heat 6

Semifinals

Semifinal 1

Semifinal 2

Final

Jany led at halfway but fell back into the pack after the turn. Ford led until the 80 metre point, when Ris passed him. Kádas, in a tight race with Ford for second place, crashed into the lane divider just before the end of the race.

Results summary

References

Men's freestyle 100 metre
Men's events at the 1948 Summer Olympics